Victor Lombardo (April 10, 1911 – January 22, 1994) was a musician and member of his brother Guy Lombardo's band, the Royal Canadians.

Early life and career
Lombardo was born in London, Ontario, Canada. Gaetano and Angelina Lombardo had seven children. His father was a tailor.

Along with his brothers Guy, Carmen, and Lebert, Victor Lombardo was a member of the original Royal Canadians, playing saxophone with the band.

In the late 1940s, Lombardo had his own 20-piece orchestra that featured "the smooth Lombardo family style of music that has won the applause of appreciative audiences throughout the entire nation." The group had its own radio program on the Mutual Broadcasting System.

Later, he rejoined the band and ultimately replaced older brother Guy as bandleader after Guy's 1977 death. That tenure was short, however, as he and the Royal Canadians parted ways early in 1978. His brother, Lebert, attributed the separation to Victor's desire to make changes in the orchestra's personnel and its sound.

Personal life and death
On November 10, 1931, Lombardo married Virginia Dabe, in Manhattan, New York. His second wife was the former Kathryn Baggott.

Lombardo died January 22, 1994, in Boca Raton Community Hospital. He was 82.

References

External links
 Victor Lombardo recordings at the Discography of American Historical Recordings.

1911 births
1994 deaths
Canadian saxophonists
Male saxophonists
Canadian people of Italian descent
20th-century saxophonists
20th-century Canadian male musicians